The Serbian First Football League (Serbian: Prva Liga Telekom Srbija) is the second-highest football league in Serbia. The league is operated by the Serbian FA. 18 teams will compete in this league for the 2010-11 season.  Two teams will be promoted to the Serbian SuperLiga and four will be relegated to the Serbian League, the third-highest division overall in the Serbian football league system.

League table

References

 Official website
 soccerway

See also 
 Serbian SuperLiga
 Serbian First League
 Serbian League
 Serbia national football team
 List of football clubs in Serbia

Serbian First League seasons
2010–11 in Serbian football leagues
Serbia